Hugh Lewis Lloyd  (22 April 1923 – 14 July 2008) was an English actor who made his name in film and television comedy from the 1960s to the 1980s. He was best known for appearances in Hancock's Half Hour, Hugh and I and other sitcoms of the 1960s.

Life
Lloyd was born on 22 April 1923 in Chester, Cheshire and attended the King's School. After leaving school he spent two years as a newspaper reporter on the Chester Chronicle.

His first professional acting appearance was with ENSA and he worked in repertory theatres until 1957, when he made the first of 25 appearances in the television series Hancock's Half Hour. Many years after its first transmission, he is still remembered as the character in the episode entitled The Blood Donor in which he forgets to return Tony Hancock's wine gums.

He appeared with Terry Scott in the series Hugh and I and The Gnomes of Dulwich; with Peggy Mount in Lollipop Loves Mr. Mole; in Jury and You Rang M'Lord?. He created the series Lord Tramp (1977), written by Michael Pertwee, in which he also starred. The Comedy Playhouse episode, Hughie, in which he starred as a recently released prisoner following the ending of Hugh and I, was unsuccessful.

Television plays in which he appeared include She's Been Away (starring Peggy Ashcroft); The Dunroamin' Rising; A Matter Of Will (with Brenda Bruce); and a number of Alan Bennett plays, such as A Visit From Miss Protheroe (with Patricia Routledge), Say Something Happened (with Julie Walters and Thora Hird), and Me, I'm Afraid Of Virginia Woolf. He played Goronwy Jones in the Doctor Who story Delta and the Bannermen and  appeared in numerous television light entertainment shows, including Victoria Wood, Jimmy Cricket and Babble Quiz.

On the West End stage, Lloyd spent three seasons at the Windmill Theatre; a year at the Strand Theatre in When We Are Married; two years in No Sex Please, We're British at the Strand; and at the Lyric Theatre in Tonight at 8.30. He was part of the Royal National Theatre company under Ian McKellen, in The Critic, The Cherry Orchard and The Duchess of Malfi. He also performed in over twenty pantomimes.

Lloyd met his fourth or fifth wife, journalist Shan Lloyd, at Allen's restaurant in London's West End, in 1978. Lloyd, who was in his fifties at the time, had been married and divorced three times before meeting Shan. In his autobiography, he described his future wife as "a scatty, blondehaired Fleet Street tabloid journalist". Hugh and Shan married in 1983. The couple moved to Worthing in 2003 and remained married until his death on 14 July 2008. Shan Lloyd died in December 2008, just five months after Hugh Lloyd.

Lloyd was awarded an MBE in the 2005 New Year Honours List for his services to drama and charity. He died on 14 July 2008 at his home in Dolphin Court, Grand Avenue, West Worthing.

Appearances

Films
The Rebel (1961) - Man on Train
Go to Blazes (1962) - Fireman
It's Trad Dad! (1962) - Usher
She'll Have To Go (1962) - Macdonald
The Mouse on the Moon (1963) - Plumber
Father Came Too! (1963) - Mary, Queen of Scots
The Punch and Judy Man (1963) - Edward Cox
Just for Fun (1963) - Burglar
Runaway Railway (1965) - Disposals Man
White Cargo (1973) - Chumley
Intimate Games (1976) - John's Father
Quadrophenia (1979) - Mr. Cale
Venom (1982) - Taxi Driver
She's Been Away (1989) - George
The Fool (1990) - Viscount
August (1996) - Thomas Prosser
The Clandestine Marriage (1998) - Reverend Parker
Alice in Wonderland (1999) - Fishface Footman
Girl from Rio (2001) - Albert

Television
Doc Martin (2005) - "Aromatherapy" (Series 2, Episode 4) - Vernon Cooke
Foyle's War (2002) - "Eagle Day" (Series 1, Episode 4) - Frank Watson
My Hero (2000) - "My Hero Christmas" (Series 1, Episode 7) - Santa
So What Now? (2001) - "The House Guest" (Episode 4) - Frank
Randall & Hopkirk (Deceased) (2000) - "A Man of Substance" (Series 1, Episode 6)
Great Expectations (1999) - The Aged P
Cider with Rosie (1998) - Joseph Brown
Heartbeat Pig in the Middle  (1997) - Archie Birley Oh, Doctor Beeching! (1997) - Ernie BennettBlue Heaven (1994) - cleanerYou Rang, M'Lord? (BBC1, 1991) Selfridge, Sir Ralph Shawcross's butler Boon (1991) - "Trial And Error" (1991) - George JenkinsVictoria Wood (1989) - Over To Pam - JimThe Play on One - The Dunroamin' Rising (1988) - WattieDoctor Who - Delta and the Bannermen (1987) - Goronwy JonesVictoria Wood As Seen On TV (1986) - BillyThat's My Boy (1984) - "Unfair Dismissal" (Season 3, Episode 5) - Jim BarnesCat's Eyes (1985) - "Something Nasty Down Below" - Charlie
Last of the Summer Wine - The Waist Land (1983) - AlexA Visit From Miss Protheroe (1978)Lord Tramp (1975) - Lord TrampLollipop (1972)Lollipop Loves Mr. Mole (1971)The Gnomes of Dulwich (1969)Hugh and I (1962)Hancock's Half Hour / Hancock (1957–61) - various rolesGreat Scott - It's Maynard! (1955-56)

 References 

External links

Obituary in The TelegraphAnthony Hayward "Obituary: Hugh Lloyd", The Independent, 16 July 2008
Obituary in The Stage''

1923 births
2008 deaths
20th-century English male actors
21st-century English male actors
English male film actors
English male stage actors
English male television actors
Male actors from Cheshire
Members of the Order of the British Empire
People educated at The King's School, Chester
People from Chester
People from Worthing